Lukas Hinds-Johnson (born 25 December 1988) is a German international rugby union player, playing for the RK 03 Berlin in the Rugby-Bundesliga and the German national rugby union team.

Career
Hinds-Johnson started his career with the Hamburger RC at the age of 14. He was part of a group of German players which were sent to South Africa in 2009 to improve their rugby skills at the  Academy as part of the Wild Rugby Academy program. He spent six months in South Africa, together with Benjamin Ulrich from RK 03 Berlin and decided upon his return to Germany to move to Berlin and join RK 03.

He made his debut for Germany against Georgia on 6 February 2010.

Stats
Lukas Hinds-Johnson's personal statistics in club and international rugby:

Club

 As of 29 April 2012

National team

European Nations Cup

Friendlies & other competitions

 As of 8 April 2012

References

External links
 Lukas Hinds-Johnson at scrum.com
  Lukas Hinds-Johnson at totalrugby.de
  Lukas Hinds-Johnson at the DRV website

1988 births
Living people
German rugby union players
Germany international rugby union players
RK 03 Berlin players
Rugby union locks
Sportspeople from Hamburg
Rugby union in Hamburg